Our Bodies, Ourselves is a book about women's health and sexuality produced by the nonprofit organization Our Bodies Ourselves (originally called the Boston Women's Health Book Collective). First published in 1970, it contains information related to many aspects of women's health and sexuality, including: sexual health, sexual orientation, gender identity, birth control, abortion, pregnancy and childbirth, violence and abuse, and menopause. The most recent edition of the book was published in 2011. The book was revolutionary in that it encouraged women to celebrate their sexuality, including chapters on reproductive rights, lesbian sexuality, and sexual independence. The move towards women's active engagement with their actual sexual desires was contradicting the popular gendered myth of "women as docile and passive," and "men as active and aggressive" in a sexual relationship.

The book has been translated and adapted by women's groups around the world and is available in 33 languages. Sales for all the books exceed four million copies. The New York Times has called the seminal book "America's best-selling book on all aspects of women's health" and a "feminist classic".



History
The health seminar that inspired the booklet was organized in 1969 by Nancy Miriam Hawley at Boston's Emmanuel College. "We weren't encouraged to ask questions, but to depend on the so-called experts," Hawley told Women's eNews. "Not having a say in our own health care frustrated and angered us. We didn't have the information we needed, so we decided to find it on our own." As a result of this goal, the book contained information intended to guide women on "how to maneuver the American health care system, with subsections called 'The Power and Role of Male Doctors,' 'The Profit Motive in Health Care,' 'Women as Health Care Workers,' and 'Hospitals.

The original writers of the book stated four main reasons for creating it. First, that personal experiences provide a valuable way to understand one's own body beyond the mere facts that experts can provide, creating an empowering learning experience. Second, this kind of learning meant that they were "better prepared to evaluate the institutions that are supposed to meet our health needs...". Third, the historical lack of self-knowledge about the female body "had had one major consequence – pregnancy" and through greater information, women will have more ability to make proactive choices about when to get pregnant. Fourth, information about one's body is perhaps the most essential kind of education, because "bodies are the physical bases from which we move out into the world". Without this basic information, women are alienated from their own body and necessarily on unequal footing with men.

The women researched and wrote up the information themselves. Wendy Sanford wrote about abortion, Jane Pincus and Ruth Bell about pregnancy, and Paula Doress and Esther Rome about postpartum depression. The 12 feminists then published their research as a 35-cent, 136-page booklet called Women and Their Bodies, published in 1970 by the New England Free Press. The booklet sold 250,000 copies in New England without any formal advertising.

As a result of their success, the women formed the non-profit Boston Women's Health Book Collective (which now goes by the name Our Bodies Ourselves) and published the first 276-page Our Bodies, Ourselves in 1973. The collective published it with the major publisher Simon & Schuster only on the condition that they would have complete editorial control and that nonprofit health centers could purchase copies at a significant discount. It featured first-person stories from women, and tackled many topics then regarded as taboo. Since then, over four million copies have been sold. It has been considered one of the founding events of the women's health movement in the United States.

In 2018, the group announced that due to financial pressures, it would no longer publish new print editions nor have the expertise to update its web site with new health information. In 2022 a new collective collaborating with the original, called Our Bodies Ourselves Today, launched a web version of updated health information.

Boston Women's Health Book Collective
The Boston Women's Health Book Collective, also known as the Our Bodies, Ourselves Collective, is a feminist group that created Our Bodies, Ourselves. The collective formed at the peak of the women's movement in Boston.

Twelve women all between the ages of 23 to 39 first attended a workshop entitled "Women and Their Bodies" which allowed the women to discuss together the issues they had surrounding their health. The discussion created a consciousness-raising environment, providing each woman with information that they all deal with when handling issues about their bodies. The strong discussion supplied the women with the necessary tools and ideas that lead to the creation of their book that addressed issues surrounding sexuality and abortion. They put their knowledge into an accessible format that served as a model for women who wanted to learn about themselves, communicate with doctors, and challenge the medical establishment to change and improve the health of women everywhere.

Reproductive justice was at the forefront during the women's liberation, causing much debate over the biological rights of women. The Equal Rights Amendment had a section specifically targeting the important issues about Reproductive justice that combines multiple reproductive rights and issues surrounding family. The strategy of the reproductive justice plank was to establish the necessary rights and access for women to gain control over their bodies. Through the passing of this legislation woman would be granted the ability to have abortions, obtain access to birth control and gain full control over their bodies.

The Boston Collective focused on these ideas to allow women the ability to understand their bodies and themselves as women. During the National Women's Conference, women from all over the country deliberated to determine the exact laws that should be put into place for women's reproductive justice. The Boston Collective work together to teach courses and create books that provide knowledge from women not only in Boston, but women across the nation. These women use their skills and knowledge to provide many women with knowledge about their lives through rhetoric that avoids describing the female reproductive system as passive, unproductive, helpless, or powerless.

The organization has also created two single-topic books. Our Bodies, Ourselves: Menopause was published in 2006, and Our Bodies, Ourselves: Pregnancy and Birth in 2008. The Boston Women's Health Book Collective earlier produced Changing Bodies, Changing Lives: A Book For Teens on Sex and Relationships and The New Ourselves, Growing Older: Women Aging with Knowledge and Power.

Style

The first book was a product of the feminist movement and could still be said to reflect its values. The personal experiences of women are taken into account and are quoted throughout, while the social and political context of women's health informs the content of the book. The book emphasizes empowerment through information and learning, specifically, information gained through women sharing their personal narratives with each other because "by sharing our responses we can develop a base on which to be critical of what the experts tell us."

Topics such as male-to-female and female-to-male transsexualism/transgenderism are discussed in the most recent edition and considered in a nonjudgmental manner. The writing style of the book tends toward a familiar, inclusive tone, with the authors referring to women and themselves as a collective group.

Documentary
The collective of women who initiated Our Bodies, Ourselves are part of the documentary She's Beautiful When She's Angry, about the founders of the modern women's movement from 1966 to 1971.

See also
 The Honest Body Project
 Trans Bodies, Trans Selves

References

Further reading
 Our Bodies Ourselves website
 "The History of Our Bodies Ourselves
 "The Sex Book That Hit the Spot"
 Our Bodies, Ourselves at The Nation
 Schlesinger, Elizabeth. "Boston Women's Health Book Collective". http://oasis.lib.harvard.edu/. President and Fellows of Harvard College.
 Martin, Emily (Spring 1991). "The Egg and the Sperm" (PDF). Chicago Journals. 16 No. 3: 485–501. .

External links 
 Complete text of the 1970–1971 edition
 Boston Women's Health Book Collective. Subject files, 1980–2000. H MS c261. Harvard Medical Library, Francis A. Countway Library of Medicine, Boston, Mass.
 "Our Bodies, Ourselves"—19 November 2020 episode of the BBC's radio program Witness History on the story of the book
 Our Bodies Ourselves Today at Suffolk University in Boston

1971 non-fiction books
Feminism and health
Feminist books
Gynaecology
Health and wellness books
Non-fiction books about sexuality
Second-wave feminism
Self-help books
Sexuality and society
Women's health movement